Pegram Truss Railroad Bridge may refer to:

Cold Springs Pegram Truss Railroad Bridge, crossing the Big Wood River near Ketchum, Idaho
Conant Creek Pegram Truss Railroad Bridge, crossing Conant Creek in Fremont County, Idaho
Gimlet Pegram Truss Railroad Bridge, crossing the Big Wood River in Blaine County, Idaho
Grace Pegram Truss Railroad Bridge, crossing the Bear River near Grace, Idaho
Pennsylvania Avenue Bridge (1890), crossing the Anacostia River in Washington, D.C.
Republican River Pegram Truss, crossing the Republican River near Concordia, Kansas
Ririe A Pegram Truss Railroad Bridge, crossing the Snake River near Ririe, Idaho
Ririe B Pegram Truss Railroad Bridge, crossing the Snake River flood channel north of Ririe, Idaho
St. Anthony Pegram Truss Railroad Bridge, crossing Henrys Fork in Fremont County, Idaho

See also
Pegram truss
George H. Pegram